Leena Katriina Lehtolainen (born 11 March 1964) is a Finnish crime novelist, best known for her series of novels about the policewoman Maria Kallio.

Lehtolainen was born in Vesanto, Northern Savonia.  Her first novel was released when she was only 12 years old. She studied literature in Helsinki until 1995 and wrote crime novels from 1993 on. Since about 2007 she has written other genres of books. Her works have been translated into various languages: Spanish, Dutch, Chinese, Lithuanian, Polish, French, Swedish, German, Estonian, Czech.
Leena Lehtolainen is married to Mikko Lensu and she has two children (Konsta Johannes, born in 1991 and Otso Olavi born in 1994). She lives in Degerby, west of Helsinki.

Awards and honours
Lehtolainen won the Finnish crime novel society yearly prize in 1997 and 1998. She received the Espoo city Award of Arts in 2000, and was nominated for the Glass Key award in 2003. In 2020 she received the national Pro Finlandia medal for her artistic merits.

Bibliography
Ja äkkiä onkin toukokuu (1976)
Kitara on rakkauteni (1981)
Ensimmäinen murhani (1993) (published in UK as My First Murder, 2012)
Harmin paikka (1994)
Kuparisydän (1995) (published in UK as Copper Heart, 2013)
Luminainen (1996)
Kuolemanspiraali (1997)
Tuulen puolella (1998)
Tappava säde (1999)
Ennen lähtöä (2000)
Sukkanauhatyttö ja muita tarinoita (2001)
Kun luulit unohtaneesi (2002)
Veren vimma (2003)
Jonakin onnellisena päivänä (2004)
Rivo Satakieli (2005)
Viimeinen kesäyö ja muita tarinoita (2006)
Luonas en ollutkaan (2007)
Väärän jäljillä (2008)
Henkivartija (2009)
Minne tytöt kadonneet (2010)
Oikeuden jalopeura (2011)
Paholaisen pennut (2012)
Rautakolmio (2013)
Kuusi kohtausta Sadusta (2014)
Surunpotku (2015)
Tiikerinsilmä (2016)
Viattomuuden loppu (2017)
Tappajan tyttöystävä ja muita rikoksia (2018)
Valapatto (2019)
Jälkikaiku (2020)
Ilvesvaara (2021)
Joulupukin suudelma (2021)
Antti Ruuskanen – Rätingin paikka (2022)

References

 Webarchive of her German website (biggest book market presence)

External links
Homepage English
Leena Lehtolainen in 375 humanists 25.03.2015, Faculty of Arts, University of Helsinki

1964 births
Living people
People from Vesanto
Writers from North Savo
Finnish crime writers
Finnish feminists
Finnish women novelists
Women crime writers